The 2014–15 season was Skënderbeu Korçë's fifth season competing in the Kategoria Superiore, having won four consecutive time titles in the last four years.

First team
{| class="wikitable"  style="text-align:center; font-size:90%; width:100%;"
|-
!  style="background:#dcdcdc; color:black; text-align:center;"| Squad No.
!  style="background:#dcdcdc; color:black; text-align:center;"| Nationality
!  style="background:#dcdcdc; color:black; text-align:center;"| Position
!  style="background:#dcdcdc; color:black; text-align:center;"| Name
!  style="background:#dcdcdc; color:black; text-align:center;"| Date Of Birth (Age)
!  style="background:#dcdcdc; color:black; text-align:center;"| Apps.
!  style="background:#dcdcdc; color:black; text-align:center;"| Goals
!  style="background:#dcdcdc; color:black; text-align:center;"| Signed In
!  style="background:#dcdcdc; color:black; text-align:center;"| Signing Fee
!  style="background:#dcdcdc; color:black; text-align:center;"| Contract Ends
|-
! colspan="10"  style="background:#dcdcdc; text-align:center;"| Goalkeepers
|-
| 1
| 
| GK
| Orges Shehi (VC)
| 
| 157
| 0
| 2010
| Free
| 2015
|-
| 12
| 
| GK
| Erjon Llapanji
| 
| 62
| 0
| 2006
| Youth System
| 2015
|-
! colspan="10"  style="background:#dcdcdc; text-align:center;"| Defenders
|-
| 3
| 
| DF
| Renato Arapi
| 
| 133
| 5
| 2010
| Free
| 2015
|-
| 4
| 
| DF
| Samir Sahiti
| 
| 5
| 0
| 2013
| Free
| 2015
|-
| 5
| 
| DF
| Bajram Jashanica
| 
| 0
| 0
| 2013
| Free
| 2015
|-
| 17
| 
| DF
| Tefik Osmani
| 
| 20
| 1
| 2014
| Free
| 2015
|-
| 20
| 
| DF
| Ademir
| 
| 48
| 1
| 2012
| €50,000
| 2015
|-
| 32
| 
| DF
| Kristi Vangjeli
| 
| 0
| 0
| 2014
| Free
| 2015
|-
| 33
| 
| DF
| Marko Radaš
| 
| 104
| 4
| 2011
| Free
| 2015
|-
! colspan="10"  style="background:#dcdcdc; text-align:center;"| Midfielders
|-
| 2
| 
| MF
| Amarildo Dimo
| 
| 69
| 3
| 2014
| €15,000
| 2015
|-
| 7
| 
| MF
| Gerhard Progni
| 
| 0
| 0
| 2014
| Free
| 2015
|-
| 9
| 
| MF
| Enkeleid Alikaj
| 
| 18
| 0
| 2014
| Free
| 2015
|-
| 10
| 
| MF
| Bledi Shkëmbi
| 
| 255
| 45
| 2008
| Free
| 2015
|-
| 14
| 
| MF
| Leonit Abazi
| 
| 12
| 0
| 2013
| Free
| 2015
|-
| 19
| 
| MF
| Bakary Nimaga
| 
| 22
| 0
| 2013
| Free
| 2017
|-
| 23
| 
| MF
| Bernard Berisha
| 
| 0
| 0
| 2014
| Free
| 2016
|-
| 77
| 
| MF
| Marconi
| 
| 0
| 0
| 2014
| Free
| 2016
|-
| 88
| 
| MF
| Sabien Lilaj
| 
| 69
| 10
| 2012
| Free
| 2015
|-
! colspan="10"  style="background:#dcdcdc; text-align:center;"| Forwards
|-
| 19
| 
| FW
| Dhiego Martins
| 
| 0
| 0
| 2014
| Free
| 2015
|-
| 27
| 
| MF
| Liridon Latifi
| 
| 0
| 0
| 2015
| Free
| 2016
|-
| 29
| 
| FW
| Fatjon Sefa
| 
| 0
| 0
| 2014
| Free
| 2015
|-
| 30
| 
| FW
| Andi Ribaj
| 
| 40
| 9
| 2013
| Free
| 2015
|-
| 77
| 
| FW
| Aco Stojkov
| 
| 0
| 0
| 2015
| Free
| 2015
|-

Transfers

In

Out

Pre-season and friendlies

Competitions

Albanian Supercup

Kategoria Superiore

League table

Results summary

Results by round

Matches

Albanian Cup

First round

Second round

Quarter-finals

Semi-finals

UEFA Champions League

Second qualifying round

References

KF Skënderbeu Korçë seasons
Skenderbeu Korce
Skenderbeu
Albanian football championship-winning seasons